The 2005 election for mayor of Chattogram City Corporation was held on 12 May 2005.The result was a victory again for the Bangladesh Awami League candidate A B M Mohiuddin Chowdhury. He beat Mir Mohammed Nasiruddin, the Bangladesh Nationalist Party's candidate and previous Mayor who was appointed to his post.

Elections

References

2005 elections in Bangladesh
2005 in Bangladesh
Local elections in Bangladesh
Elections in Chittagong